The City of Ekurhuleni Metropolitan Municipality is a metropolitan municipality that forms the local government of the East Rand region of Gauteng. The municipality itself is a large suburban region east of Johannesburg. The name Ekurhuleni means place of peace in XiTsonga. Ekurhuleni is one of the five districts of Gauteng province and one of the eight metropolitan municipalities of South Africa. The seat of Ekurhuleni is Germiston and the most spoken language is Zulu at 28.8%. The city is home to South Africa's busiest airport, OR Tambo International Airport, which is located in the Kempton Park area of Ekurhuleni.

History
The municipality was established in 2000, the result of a merger between the Eastern Gauteng Services Council, the Khayalami Metropolitan Council, and the previous municipalities of Alberton, Benoni, Boksburg, Brakpan, Edenvale/Lethabong, Germiston, Kempton Park/Tembisa, Nigel and Springs. The planned expansion of Ekurhuleni through the abolition of the Lesedi Local Municipality, which includes Heidelberg, and its absorption into Ekurhuleni after the 2016 municipal elections, were blocked by the High Court of South Africa in 2015.

The name Ekurhuleni meaning place of peace alludes to the fact that the East Rand townships were the site of severe political violence between supporters of the Inkatha Freedom Party and the ANC in the early 1990s, prior to South Africa's first non-racial elections in 1994.

Geography
Ekurhuleni lies on the highveld plateau at about 1600 metres in altitude above sea level (asl). The highest elevation is at the Gillooly's Ridge – Bill Stewart Side – Fisher's Hill at 1772 metres asl. The lowest point is at 1552 metres asl. The city is rich in wetlands, pans, streams and rivers. The city is highly urbanised; however, the north especially has high-potential agricultural land.

Climate
Ekurhuleni has a subtropical highland climate (Cwb) according to the Köppen-Geiger Climate classification. This is a temperate climate of warm summers and dry winters. In the winter months (May - October) the city has a diurnal temperature pattern with a high amplitude, as temperatures can range from freezing at night to mid 20s °C in the day.

The main precipitation falls between October and March with a monthly average precipitation of up to 148 mm  which falls usually in convective thundershowers. The daily maximum temperatures in October–March are on average 27°C. The Winter is mostly dry with only a few cold fronts reaching the highveld from the southern Atlantic Ocean.

Main places

The 2011 census divided the municipality into inter alia the following main places:

Parks and nature
Ekurhuleni has over 206 wetlands and lakes.

Germiston Lake is a natural pan in the Elsburgspruit system and has a catchment area of 1174ha. It is fed mostly by surface runoff water and storm water drains. The lake is one of the cleanest bodies of water in South Africa. It has a size of 57.4 ha and a maximum capacity of 2839×. Its depth is approximately 8 metres. On the banks of the lake are a recreational park with playground equipment and braai areas as well as a rowing club and golf club.

A wetland of note is the Blesbokriver wetland which stretches over an area of 1858ha.

Flamingos can be found in the Marievale Bird sanctuary.

The Bullfrog Pan is almost 10 hectares and is home to more than 150 bird species.

Landmarks

In 2017, the Chris Hani memorial at Thomas Nkobi Memorial Park in Boksburg was revealed during the 22nd commemoration of his death. The Chris Hani memorial site consists of the Monument, the Walk of Remembrance and the Wall of Remembrance which recognizes the historical events, places and people associated with the liberation struggle of South Africa.

The Thokoza Wall of Remembrance commemorates the people who died in the fight between the Inkatha Freedom Party and the residents.

Arts and culture

Ekurhuleni has a rich cultural life. In 2017, the Thami Mnyele Fine arts award had its 30th anniversary.

The local music scene is well and alive and Ekurhuleni gave rise to a few notable music stars.

O.R. Tambo Narrative Centre tells visitors all about the lives and contributions of the Tambo couple towards the dismantling of Apartheid in South Africa. It is situated on the banks of the Leeupan Wetland. It also has an exhibition of environmental education aimed at children.

Since 2016, Ekurhuleni has hosted the Ekurhuleni International Film Festival.

Demographics

In 2016, 3,379,104 people lived in Ekurhuleni, of whom 22.7% were under 15 years old, 71.2% were between the ages of 15-64 and 6.1% were older than 65 years old. Ekurhuleni had 1,299,490 households with an average people per household number of 2.6. 80.2% of people lived in formal dwellings and 52.9% owned housing.

The following statistics are from the 2001 census.

Gender

Ethnic groups

Education

Ekurhuleni has two school districts: Ekurhuleni North and Ekurhuleni South. There are 671 schools in Ekurhuleni, of which 137 are independent. Ekurhuleni has two colleges of further education and training (FET) as well as two centres of adult education and training (AET). The municipal government under Executive Mayor Mzwandile Masina conducted a feasibility study and lobbied the national government to establish a university in Ekurhuleni  which was formally announced by President Cyril Ramaphosa in the 2020 State of the Nation Address.

Governance and politics 

The governance of Ekurhuleni is set out by Chapter 7 of the Constitution of South Africa which governs the operation and function of local government in South Africa. The Local Government: Municipal Structures Act 117 of 1998 states that the minister responsible for local government, namely the Minister of Cooperative Governance and Traditional Affairs, is responsible for the designation of municipalities. As per the act and regulations issued by the Minister, Ekurhuleni is designated as a category A municipality and is thus a metropolitan municipality. The external boundaries of the municipality and subsequently the remit of the jurisdiction of the metropolitan government is regulated by the Municipal Demarcation Board.

As of 11 April 2011, the Municipal Council approved the separation of the legislative and executive functions of the metropolitan government. The executive head of the municipality is the Executive Mayor, who as of 8 November 2022 is Tania Campbell, of the Democratic Alliance. Under Section 56 of the Municipal Structures Act, the Executive Mayor is responsible for directing and monitoring, and presiding over Mayoral Committee. The Mayoral Committee comprises the administrative branch of the municipality and is responsible for bringing to effect the by-laws of the Municipal Council, administering the responsibilities designated by national and provincial legislation, as well as providing for the political oversight for the functioning of the city structures. A professional civil servant known as the City Manager, currently Dr Imogen Mashazi, is responsible for the technical and managerial direction and oversight of the municipality. 

In 2014/2015, the city ranked highest out of all metros in South Africa in the Business Day Index, measuring how well cities and towns spend resident's money.

The municipal council consists of 224 members elected by mixed-member proportional representation. Of these 224, 112 are elected by first-past-the-post voting in 112 wards, while the remaining 112 are chosen from party lists so that the total number of party representatives is proportional to the number of votes received. In the 2021 South African municipal election, no party obtained a majority of seats on the council.

The following table shows the results of the 2021 election.

Economy
, the GDP of Ekurhuleni was estimated at over US$55 billion (PPP), being US$17,361 per person. Ekurhuleni has an active workforce of 1.6 million people of whom 28.8% are unemployed. Ekurhuleni makes up 6.2% of national production.

Ekurhuleni is home to the Rand Refinery, the largest integrated single-site precious metals refining and smelting complex in the world.

Manufacturing

The city is an important manufacturing centre in South Africa, contributing 32% of manufacturing production. The city has been described as "the workshop of the country". It contributes 11% to the GVA of South Africa.

Ekurhuleni has held the "Manufacturing Indaba" Conference every year since 2014. This two-day conference provides contacts and networking between business owners, industry owners, capital providers, experts and the government.

Infrastructure

Road network
Ekurhuleni is connected to the main motorways in South Africa via the M2, N3, N17, R21, R24 and R59 highways. As Ekurhuleni is part of the Johannesburg Conurbation, Transport routes in Ekurhuleni share the same metropolitan route numbering system as Johannesburg.

The road network in Ekurhuleni spans 8,024 km of paved roads and approximately 1,200 km of gravel road.

Public transport
Ekurhuleni is one of 13 cities and towns in South Africa to implement the bus rapid transit (BRT) system. Phase 1 of the project runs from Tembisa to Vosloorus via Kempton Park and the OR Tambo International Airport. New routes have been integrated from Katlehong to Rhodesfield, from Vosloorus to Rhodesfield, and from Reiger Park to Rhodesfield. Passengers are served by Metrorail which sustains the passenger rail network in the Western Cape, Gauteng, KwaZulu-Natal and the Eastern Cape. Seven train lines serve Ekurhuleni.

Rail
Ekurhuleni has the largest rail hub in South Africa used by Transnet.

Aviation

Several airline companies are headquartered in the Kempton Park area of Ekurhuleni.

Ekurhuleni is Gauteng's first aerotropolis. This is a metropolis with an airport at its centre. One should be able to get to the airport from anywhere in Ekurhuleni in 25 min. The major aim will be logistics and connecting the local industry and agriculture to the world markets.

O.R. Tambo International Airport has two terminals handling domestic and international flights. Terminal A handles international traffic and Terminal B domestic flights. The airport services airlines from all five continents and plays a vital role in serving the local, regional, intra- and inter-continental air transport needs of South Africa and sub-Saharan Africa. It is the biggest and busiest airport in Africa. OR Tambo International handles more than 20 million passengers per year and employs more than 18,000 people.

South African Airways, the flagship air carrier of South Africa, and its subsidiary South African Express have their head offices in Ekurhuleni. Mango, a low cost airline owned by SAA, is headquartered on the grounds of OR Tambo International Airport.

Federal Air has its headquarters on the OR Tambo International Airport grounds. 1Time has its head office in the Isando Industrial Park. Safair's head office is in Kempton Park.

Airports Company South Africa has its head office in Bedfordview, Ekurhuleni. TAAG Angola Airlines has an office in Bedfordview.

Stormwater systems
There are 11,318 storm water systems and a total lengths of pipes and channels of more than 3800 km.

Sports and recreation

Ekurhuleni has at least 16 golf courses and is home to the international Golf Tournament the South African Open held at Glendower Golf Club.

There is an over 100 year old rowing club at the bank of Germiston Lake, and over 30 swimming pools can be found in the city.

Ekurhuleni United FC play in the fourth division of South African Football.

Ekurhuleni has the Ekurhuleni masters league, a soccer league of retired pros and talented players who did not make the cut.

38 eco "outdoor gyms" can be found in Ekurhuleni.

Management
Although Eskom has identified Ekurhuleni as a municipality with a poor payment record, its 2021 debt with the power utility amounted to R8 million which compared favourably with the rest of Gauteng.

Notable people from Ekurhuleni

 Willem Coertzen
 Lood de Jager
 Ernie Els
 Chris Hani
 Jakkals Keevy
 Sibusiso Khumalo
 Kelly Khumalo 
 Kwesta
 Rebecca Malope 
 Lebo Mathosa
 Senzo Meyiwa
 Pearl Modiadie
 Nthati Moshesh
 Japie Mulder
 Emmanuel Asanda 'Scara' Ngobese 
 Khethi Ngwenya
 Chris Rossouw (rugby union born 1969)
 Oliver Tambo
 Jaco Taute
 Charlize Theron

References

Citations

General and cited sources 
 Municipal Demarcation Board
 Stats SA Census 2001 page
 Independent Electoral Commission 2004 election results

External links
 City of Ekurhuleni Metropolitan Municipality—official site
 History of Ekurhuleni
 Integrated Transport Plan
 Official statement on substituting Ekurhuleni Metropolitan Municipality with City of Ekurhuleni Metropolitan Municipality

 
Government of Alberton
Government of the East Rand
Greater Johannesburg
Metropolitan municipalities of Gauteng